63rd Street station is an elevated  rapid transit station in Philadelphia, Pennsylvania, served by SEPTA's Market–Frankford Line trains. Located at the intersection of 63rd and Market Streets in the Haddington neighborhood of West Philadelphia, it is the westernmost stop on the line within the Philadelphia city limits.

The station is also served by SEPTA bus routes 21 and 31. The station is also the northern terminus of the Cobbs Creek Trail.

History

The station was closed on June 13, 2008 for rehabilitation as part of a multi-phase reconstruction of the entire western Market Street Elevated. The renovated station included new elevators, escalators, lighting, and other infrastructure, as well as a new brick station house. The station reopened on May 4, 2009. The project resulted in the station becoming compliant with the Americans with Disabilities Act.

Station layout
There are two side platforms connecting to a station house on the southeast corner of 63rd and Market streets. There are also three exit-only staircases; two descend to the west side of 63rd Street and one to the northwest corner of Market and Felton streets.

Unlike other stations along the western elevated portion of the line, the corridor between the station house and westbound platform is above the tracks rather than below.

References

External links
 

 Station house from Google Maps Street View
 Images at NYCSubway.org

SEPTA Market-Frankford Line stations
Railway stations in Philadelphia
Railway stations in the United States opened in 1907
1907 establishments in Pennsylvania